The Soviet Union's 1980 nuclear test series was a group of 24 nuclear tests conducted in 1980. These tests  followed the 1979 Soviet nuclear tests series and preceded the 1981 Soviet nuclear tests series.

References

1980
1980 in the Soviet Union
1980 in military history
Explosions in 1980